John Aylmer may refer to:

John Aylmer (bishop) (1521–1594), English bishop, constitutionalist and Greek scholar
John Aylmer (classicist) (died 1672), Greek and Latin poet
John Aylmer (politician) (1652–1705), Irish MP
Jack Aylmer (John Francis Aylmer, 1934–2018), American politician and college president